Methylmalonyl-CoA mutase (MCM), mitochondrial, also known as methylmalonyl-CoA isomerase, is a protein that in humans is encoded by the MUT gene. This vitamin B12-dependent enzyme catalyzes the isomerization of methylmalonyl-CoA to succinyl-CoA in humans. Mutations in MUT gene may lead to various types of methylmalonic aciduria.

MCM was first identified in rat liver and sheep kidney in 1955. In its latent form, it is 750 amino acids in length. Upon entry to the mitochondria, the 32 amino acid mitochondrial leader sequence at the N-terminus of the protein is cleaved, forming the fully processed monomer. The monomers then associate into homodimers, and bind AdoCbl (one for each monomer active site) to form the final, active holoenzyme form.

Structure

Gene

The MUT gene lies on the chromosome location of 6p12.3 and consists of 13 exons, spanning over 35kb.

Protein

The mature enzyme is a homodimer with the N-terminal CoA binding domain and the C- terminal cobalamin-binding domain.

Function 

Methylmalonyl-CoA mutase is expressed in high concentrations in the kidney, in intermediate concentrations in the heart, ovaries, brain, muscle, and liver, and in low concentrations in the spleen. The enzyme can be found all throughout the central nervous system (CNS). MCM resides in the mitochondria, where a number of substances, including the branched-chain amino acids isoleucine and valine, as well as methionine, threonine, thymine and odd-chain fatty acids, are metabolized via methylmalonate semialdehyde (MMlSA) or propionyl-CoA (Pr-CoA) to a common compound - methylmalonyl-CoA (MMl-CoA).
MCM catalyzes the reversible isomerisation of l‐methylmalonyl‐CoA to succinyl‐CoA, requiring cobalamin (vitamin B12) in the form of adenosylcobalamin (AdoCbl) as a cofactor. As an important step in propionate catabolism, this reaction is required for the degradation of odd-chain fatty acids, the amino acids valine, isoleucine, methionine, and threonine, and cholesterol, funneling metabolites from the breakdown of these amino acids into the tricarboxylic acid cycle.

Methylmalonyl-CoA mutase catalyzes the following reaction:

The substrate of methylmalonyl-CoA mutase, methylmalonyl-CoA, is primarily derived from  propionyl-CoA, a substance formed from the catabolism and digestion of isoleucine, valine, threonine, methionine, thymine, cholesterol, or odd-chain fatty acids. The product of the enzyme, succinyl-CoA, is a key molecule of the tricarboxylic acid cycle.

Clinical significance

A deficiency of this enzyme is responsible for an inherited disorder of metabolism, methylmalonyl-CoA mutase deficiency, which is one of the causes of methylmalonic acidemia (also referred to as methylmalonic aciduria or MMA). MMA is an autosomal recessive inherited inborn error of metabolism, characterized by recurrent episodes of vomiting, lethargy, profound ketoacidosis, hyperammonemia, and pancytopenia in infancy, and may cause early death. Complications include cardiomyopathy, metabolic stroke, pancreatitis, and progressive renal failure.

Either mutations to the gene MUT (encodes methylmalonyl-CoA mutase), or MMAA (encodes a chaperone protein of methylmalonyl-CoA mutase, MMAA protein) can lead to methylmalonyl acidemia. Mutations to MUT can be categorized as either MUT0 (demonstrates no activity even in presence of excess AdoCbl), or MUT1 (demonstrates very low activity in presence of excess AdoCbl). Over half of the mutations of MUT are missense mutations while nonsense mutations comprise a significant remaining fraction (approximately 14%)

Common treatment methods for MMA include a liver transplant or a liver and kidney transplant to combat the renal disease of methylmalonic acidemia. However, detrimental neurological effects can continue to plague patients even after a successful operation. It is thought that this is due to the widespread presence of methylmalonyl-CoA mutase throughout the central nervous system. Due to the loss of functionality of the enzyme, substrate levels build up in the CNS. The substrate, L-methylmalonyl-CoA hydrolyzes to form methylmalonate (methylmalonic acid), a neurotoxic dicarboxylic acid that, due to the poor dicarboxylic acid transport capacities of the blood-brain barrier, is effectively trapped within the CNS, leading to neurological debilitation. To combat these effects perioperative anti-catabolic regimes and no diet discontinuation are recommended.

The murine model has proven an adequate and accurate way of studying the effects of MMA, and potential treatment methods.

Mechanism
 
The MCM reaction mechanism begins with homolytic cleavage of AdoB12's C-Co(III) bond, the C and Co atoms each acquire one of the electrons that formed the cleaved electron pair bond. The Co ion, therefore, fluctuates between its Co(III) and Co(II) oxidation states [the two states are spectroscopically distinguishable: Co(III) is red and diamagnetic (no unpaired electrons), whereas Co(II) is yellow and paramagnetic (unpaired electrons)]. Hence, the role of coenzyme B-12 in the catalytic process is that of a reversible generator of a free radical. The C-Co(III) bond is weak, with a dissociation energy = 109 kJ/mol, and appears to be further weakened through steric interactions with the enzyme. The homolytic reaction is unusual in biology, as is the presence of a metal-carbon bond.

Methylmalonyl-CoA mutase is a member of the isomerase subfamily of adenosylcobalamin-dependent enzymes. Furthermore, it is classified as class I, as it is a ‘DMB-off’/’His-on’ enzyme. This refers to the nature of the AdoCbl cofactor in the active site of methylmalonyl CoA. AdoCbl is composed of a central cobalt-containing corrin ring, an upper axial ligand (β-axial ligand), and a lower axial ligand (α-axial ligand). In methylmalonyl-CoA mutase, the β-axial ligand 5’-deoxy-5’-adenosine reversibly dissociated to give the deoxyadenosyl radical. The α-axial ligand 5,6-dimethylbenzimidazole (DMB) is involved in organizing the active site to enable histidine-610 to bond with Co, instead of DMB (the reason for the ‘DMB-off’/’His-on’ notation). Binding of histidine-610 residue increases the rate of homolytic β-axial ligand – Co bond breakage by a factor of 1012.

Other important residues of methylmalonyl-CoA mutase include Histidine-244, which acts as a general acid near the substrate and shields the radical species from side reactions involving oxygen, Glutamate-370, whose hydrogen bond with the 2’-OH group of the ribose of the β-axial ligand forces interaction between the β-axial ligand radical species and the substrate, and tyrosine-89 which stabilizes reactive radical intermediates and accounts for the stereo-selectivity of the enzyme.

The processing protein, MMAA protein, fills the important role of aiding cofactor loading and exchange.  MMAA protein favors association with the MCM apoenzyme, and allows for the transfer of the AdoCbl cofactor to the enzyme active site. Furthermore, if the bound AdoCbl accrues oxidative damage during normal functioning, MMAA protein fosters exchange of the damaged cofactor for a new AdoCbl via a GTP-reliant pathway.

Interactions 

 MMAA
 Vitamin B12
 MeaB
 CoA-esters
 MMAB
 MMACHC
 MMADHC

References

Further reading

External links 
  GeneReviews/NIH/NCBI/UW entry on Methylmalonic Acidemia
 

Human proteins
EC 5.4.99